Devarkadra Assembly constituency is a constituency of Telangana Legislative Assembly, India. It is one among 14 constituencies in Mahbubnagar district. It is part of Mahbubnagar Lok Sabha constituency.

Alla Venkateshwar Reddy of Telangana Rashtra Samithi won the election in 2014
and for a second time he won in 2019 general assembly elections by majority of around 37000 votes.

Mandals
The Assembly Constituency presently comprises the following Mandals:

Members of Legislative Assembly

Election results

Telangana Legislative Assembly election, 2018

See also
 List of constituencies of Telangana Legislative Assembly

References

Assembly constituencies of Telangana
Mahbubnagar district